Father of Mercy is a 2004 Italian television movie directed by Cinzia Th. Torrini. The film is based on real life events of  Roman Catholic priest and then  Blessed Carlo Gnocchi.

Plot 
The film describes the life of Father Carlo Gnocchi, and Italian priest who dedicated himself to minister to wounded and dying soldiers during World War Two, and the war's victims in Italy. Gnocchi volunteered to be the military Chaplain on the battle front, following which, he started a foundation to aid the children victims of the war.

Cast 

 Daniele Liotti as  Don Gnocchi
 Giulio Pampiglioni as Matteo
  Francesco Martino as Francesco
  Alexandra Mutu as Sara
 Pietro Taricone as Giuseppe Esposito aka Margherita
  Matteo Ripaldi as Pierandrea
  Luisa Maneri as Rebecca
 Mattia Sbragia as Baldacci
 Ugo Pagliai as  Cardinal Schuster
  Lucio Zagaria as Sartorelli
  Luciano Roffi as General Lancia
 Philippe Leroy as   Pope Pius XII
 Roberto Citran

References

External links

2007 television films
2007 films
Italian television films
2000s biographical drama films
Films set in Italy
Italian biographical drama films
Films about religion
Films directed by Giacomo Campiotti
Films about Catholic priests
Films scored by Guido & Maurizio De Angelis
2007 drama films
2000s Italian films
2000s Italian-language films